Amú Amigos is an Irish-language TV travel show with a mainly young audience. Hector travels to various countries, meeting and chatting with the locals in English/Spanish and then explaining to the audience in Irish. His enthusiasm and love for the Irish language  has influenced many other programmes on TG4. Each show attracts in the range of 50,000 viewers.

Amú Amigos was followed with other similar series such as:
 Amú le Hector
 Hector i Meiriceá
 Hector san Afraic
 Hector san Astráil

In one episode of the show, Hector attended a bullfight in Mexico. He claimed that he "loved it" and drew criticism from anti-bloodsports groups.

External links
 http://www.tg4.ie

Irish travel television series
Irish-language television shows
TG4 original programming